Otto Stumpf is a former West German slalom canoeist who competed in the 1950s and the 1960s. He won four medals in the C-1 team event at the ICF Canoe Slalom World Championships with a gold (1957), two silvers (1963, 1965) and a bronze (1967).

References

German male canoeists
Possibly living people
Year of birth missing (living people)
Medalists at the ICF Canoe Slalom World Championships